was a town located in Kitasaitama District, Saitama Prefecture, Japan.

As of 2003, the town had an estimated population of 20,105 and a density of 702.97 persons per km². The total area was 28.60 km².

On March 23, 2010, Kisai, along with the towns of Kitakawabe and Ōtone (all from Kitasaitama District), was merged into the expanded city of Kazo. Kitasaitama District was dissolved as a result of this merger.

Dissolved municipalities of Saitama Prefecture
Kazo, Saitama